Bernd Grimmer (30 March 1950 – 18 December 2021) was a German politician. A member of Alternative for Germany, he served in the Landtag of Baden-Württemberg from 2016 to 2021. 

Grimmer was a critic of COVID-19 vaccination mandates. He died from COVID-19 aged 71 on 18 December 2021, amid the COVID-19 pandemic in Germany.

References 

1950 births
2021 deaths
People from Pforzheim
Alternative for Germany politicians
Members of the Landtag of Baden-Württemberg
Deaths from the COVID-19 pandemic in Germany
Anti-vaccination activist deaths from the COVID-19 pandemic